Tony Thompson may refer to:

Tony Thompson (drummer) (1954–2003), American session drummer
Tony Thompson (singer) (1975–2007), R&B vocalist and Hi-Five lead singer
Tony Thompson (boxer) (born 1971), American boxer
Tony Thompson (footballer) (born 1994), English footballer

See also
Toni Thompson, Shortland Street character
Anthony Thompson (disambiguation)